Nga Yiu or Muk Wu Nga Yiu is a village in Ta Kwu Ling, North District, Hong Kong.

Administration
Nga Yiu is a recognized village under the New Territories Small House Policy.

Features
One of the seven MacIntosh Forts of Hong Kong is located at Nga Yiu.

See also
 Muk Wu

References

External links

 Delineation of area of existing village Nga Yiu (Ta Kwu Ling) for election of resident representative (2019 to 2022)

Villages in North District, Hong Kong